Frederick Jardine (born 27 September 1941 died 7 october 2019 was a Scottish former professional footballer, best known as a player for Luton Town.

Career

Jardine played youth football for Edina Hearts, and turned professional with Dundee. Moving south to English team Luton Town in 1961, Jardine made 243 appearances for the club before leaving for Torquay United in 1971. After his first full season with Torquay, Jardine left to join Ampthill Town.

References

1941 births
Living people
Scottish footballers
Scottish Football League players
English Football League players
Dundee F.C. players
Luton Town F.C. players
Torquay United F.C. players
Ampthill Town F.C. players
Footballers from Edinburgh
Association football defenders